Klender Baru Station (KLDB) is a class II railway station located in Penggilingan, Cakung, East Jakarta. The station, which is located at an altitude of +11 meters, is included in the Operation Area I Jakarta and only serves the KRL Commuterline route. This station now has four railway tracks.

This station is also called Pondok Kopi Station oftenly because of its location at the north of Pondok Kopi urban village (Kelurahan), although this station is not located at the Pondok Kopi kelurahan administratively.

Building and layout 

The station now has four railway lines.

Since 13 December 2018, this station, along with four other railway stations on the Jakarta–Cikarang (and ), have used a new building with a futuristic modern minimalist architecture which is located slightly to the east of the old building. This relocation changed the layout of the railway track, which was originally flanked by two side platforms into one island platform between the two tracks.

Services
The following is a list of train services at the Klender Baru Station.

Passenger services 
 KAI Commuter
  Cikarang Loop Line (Full Racket)
  Cikarang Loop Line (Half Racket), to / (via  and ) and

Supporting transportation

Gallery

References

External links 
 

East Jakarta
Railway stations in Jakarta